Bloudkova velikanka ("Bloudek Giant"), also Bloudek-Rožmanova velikanka, is a large ski jumping hill in Planica, Slovenia, originally opened in 1934. In 2001 the hill collapsed and was completely rebuilt in 2012. A new normal hill (HS102) was also built next to Bloudkova velikanka in 2012, replacing the old K90 hill. A total of ten world records were set at the venue in the 1930s and 1940s.

The hill was originally constructed by Ivan Rožman, and was named after Stanko Bloudek. It was later renamed to Bloudek-Rožmanova velikanka in honour of Rožman. A year after opening, Bloudek became the main constructor, improving the hill until his death.

The axis and the name of the hill are protected as a technical monument by the Slovenian Institute for Cultural Heritage, and cannot be changed due to the historical significance.

History 
Ski jumping in Planica began to develop when the village of Rateče received railway connections. The first K20 hill was built in 1930, located in the middle of the Planica-Rateče road, with some remains still visible today.

On 20 December 1931, the ski resort Dom Ilirija (now Dom Planica) opened at the initiative of Joso Gorec, who was at the time the General Secretary of the Yugoslav Winter Sports Association and a member of the Ilirija Ski Club Ljubljana. Next to the hotel, a swimming pool and tennis courts were built, as Gorec had a vision that Planica would become a modern Nordic ski resort in the future.

1932–1934: Construction and opening

In 1932, Joso Gorec asked constructor Stanko Bloudek to construct a large hill, so he drew plans for the K80 hill, which was the largest size allowed by the International Ski Federation at the time. Bloudek found a suitable location and did a geodetic survey, started the construction, but soon ran out of money. Ivan Rožman, the owner of a construction company, immediately stepped in and drew plans for the K90 hill. Gorec decided to rather build a larger hill using Rožman's plans instead of Bloudek's plans, who was then left out.

In 1933, construction began and was completed in only two months, from October to December. Problems arose before construction started as local farmers from the  Rateče area did not want to sell the land, but they eventually changed their minds and sold it.

On 4 February 1934, Bloudkova velikanka, constructed by Ivan Rožman, was officially opened with the Kingdom of Yugoslavia National Championships in front of 2,500 people.

1935–1941: Hill expansion, naming arguments and world records 
Bloudek returned to Planica and took control over the hill as a constructor/developer until his death in 1959. He constructed a new and larger K106 hill. The same year Rožman stepped out as an engineer in Planica. They argued over who was the original constructor and why the hill was not named after him. Rožman blamed Joso Gorec, who named the hill after his friend Bloudek, although Rožman was the original constructor. For years, there was a public misconception that Bloudek was the original hill constructor. Years later, the hill was renamed to Bloudek-Rožmanova velikanka.

On 17 March 1935 there was an international competition with over 12,000 visitors. During the competition, the world record was set by Stanisław Marusarz (95 metres) and Reidar Andersen (93 and 99 metres).

The distance had to be displayed as 101 metres on the scoreboard due to lack of space.

On 2 March 1941, the last Ski Flying Study competition before the World War II outbreak in Yugoslavia was held, with 15,000 spectators in attendance.

The fourth and final round had a series of long jumps: Heinz Palme reached , but a ground touch invalidated his world record distance. Right after him the rest jumped in that order: Hans Lahr (111 metres), Paul Krauß (112 m), and Franz Mair (109 m with fall).

1947–2001: The last hill world record, World Cup, and collapse 
On 24 March 1947, the first post-war competition was held. The winner of the Ski Flying Week was Rudi Finžgar, who also set a new national record of  during training.

Between 14 and 17 March 1948, there was a four-day international ski flying week competition in front of a total 20,000 spectators. There were also two world record distance crashes by Janez Polda (120 metres) and Charles Blum (121 metres).

In 1954, the hill was renovated as a new concrete judge tower was built. In addition, the hill was expanded, received a new profile, and was reopened and back in use for the Planica's Ski Flying week in March 1954.

In 1980, Bloudkova velikanka hosted the first FIS Ski Jumping World Cup event. The hill became a standard and regular host of World Cup events until 1998. Since 1998, all Planica events were held on the ski flying hill (Letalnica bratov Gorišek).

The hill was in use until 16 December 2001, when the upper part of the concrete foundation collapsed during snowmaking. In the same year, the last international competition on the old hill was held. For many years after the collapse of the hill, there were plans to rebuild it. A decade later, in July 2011, they demolished the inrun, the judge tower and the television tower, but left the "German tower" which is part of the Slovenian culture heritage. The last construction point of the old hill was at K130 and the last hill size at HS140.

2011–present: Reconstruction 
In July 2011, the Slovenian government and the Planica Nordic Centre signed a contract for the complete renovation of the hill, worth €6.2 million. At the same location where the original large hill was standing, which is also part of the Slovenian culture heritage, they rebuilt the hill at the hill size of 139 metres with a new profile, inrun, and judge and television towers. Right next to the large hill they built a new normal hill with the hill size of 104 metres. Both hills were designed by Slovenian architects Matej Blenkuš, Miloš Florijančič and Klemen Kobal. The hills were opened on 14 October 2012 with the national championships.

The first person who jumped on the new HS139 hill was Aleš Hlebanja. He received this honour because his grandmother was the first to sell a private property around the hill, which was needed for the construction of the Planica Nordic Centre. Primož Peterka was honoured with an inaugural jump on the new HS104 hill. In 2014, Bloudkova velikanka hosted the World Cup event for the first time since 1998, because the main ski flying hill was closed at the time due to major renovations.

Events

Men's ski jumping

Women's ski jumping

List of world records 
A total of ten official world records have been set at the hill.

Srednja skakalnica (HS102) 

Srednja skakalnica (literally "Normal hill") is a HS102 normal hill, designed by Klemen Kobal.

It was built in 2012 next to Bloudkova velikanka and replaced the old Srednja Bloudkova K90 hill, which was in use until 2011. It is called simply "Normal hill" because the axis and the name of Bloudkova velikanka are protected by a monument and cannot be changed or used in other structures.

The hill was built as an accompanying facility mainly for the organization of the FIS Nordic World Ski Championships, for which Planica ran several times.

Women's ski jumping

Men's ski jumping

Mixed team ski jumping

See also 
 Letalnica bratov Gorišek 
 Planica Nordic Centre
 Srednja Bloudkova

References

External links 

 
Planica Nordic Centre
List of international events (1934–2011)
List of Planica & Slovenian national records

Ski jumping venues in Slovenia
Ski flying venues
Sports venues completed in 1934
1934 establishments in Yugoslavia
Municipality of Kranjska Gora
Sport in the Alps